The Cats were a Dutch rock band formed in Volendam in 1964.

They were active (with a few interruptions) from 1964 until 1985 and had their most successful period from 1968 until 1975.

Of the many hits the band had at home and abroad, the biggest one is "One Way Wind", which was released in 38 countries and a top ten number in several of them, of which it was a number one in Switzerland. In Germany it sold more than a million copies. The song has been covered by some 150 other artists. The number was written by Arnold Muhren, bass-player and chief composer.

Further band members were Cees Veerman (vocals/guitar/percussion) and Piet Veerman (vocals/guitar), Theo Klouwer (drums), and Jaap Schilder (guitar) and Piet Keizer (guitar; for three years).

Career

1960s
The band began life as two separate duos: Cees Veerman (6 October 1943 - 15 March 2014) and Arnold Muhren (born 28 January 1944) who started in a skiffle band; and cousins Piet Veerman (born 1 March 1943) and Jaap Schilder (born 9 January 1943) who modelled themselves after the Everly Brothers. The duos merged and became The Mystic Four, with Cees and Piet Veerman on vocals and guitar, Schilder on guitar (and piano), and Muhren on bass. By 1965 they changed their name to The Blue Cats, a reference to the colour of their suits and Cees' nickname, Poes (Dutch for 'cat'). Dropping the 'Blue' from their name in 1966 they recruited drummer Theo Klouwer (30 June 1947 – 8 February 2001).

The Cats borrowed money from Jan Buys, who was later to become their manager, and recorded their first singles that immediately entered the charts. Singing in English thanks to a songwriting duo from England, the group sounded British. Cees initially performed the majority of the lead vocals but that was to change by 1968 when the band recorded a cover version of Studio Six' "Times Were When"; Piet felt that this song suited his voice better and Cees agreed. Arnold's lyrics and Piet's sad voice appeared to be a match made in heaven, spawning five Top 10 hits in the next two years including "Lea" (dedicated to a faithful fan who died in a car accident), "Why?", "Scarlet Ribbons"  and "Marian".

1970s

Their international popularity began to grow. By spring 1970 the Cats toured Suriname and the Netherlands Antilles and played one show on 4 April 1970 in Guyana. A tour of Indonesia followed early 1971.

"Don't Waste Your Time" broke a string of Top 10 chart dominations, but the next single, "One Way Wind", became The Cats' biggest ever hit. In Germany it reached Number One chart position and in 1972 the band responded by releasing Katzenspiele (Cat's Play), featuring their hits rerecorded in German.

By now, the band were very popular and had a busy touring schedule, which began to take its toll Cees contracted voice problems. Crew member Piet Keizer replaced him temporarily. In 1974 the Cats released The Love in Your Eyes, an album recorded at the Larrabee Sound Studios in Los Angeles by session musicians, with the Cats members only laying down vocals. Cees Veerman said about those sessions, "'Be My Day' topped the charts, which was a great thing, but the rest of that pre-baked stuff should've been chucked into the ocean near Malibu".

Their Malibu sojourn did not stop The Cats from using the same team of musicians for the follow-up record Hard To Be Friends, although this time the vocals were recorded at home. "Come Sunday" and the title track charted in late 1974 and early 1975. Cees had left by then left but he returned a year later. Although the hits continued they didn't recapture past glories.

In 1978 The Cats were booked to appear on chart-show to playback "She Was Too Young". It was, however, a thinly-disguised solo-performance by Cees.  By the end of 1979 The Cats decided to disband. A farewell-single (a reissue of the 1972 track "End of the Show") charted as late as April 1980.

Solo careers
In 1976, Cees Veerman released a solo album called "Another Side of Me", which spawned the single "Sailor, Sail On (Dreamer, Dream On)".

After a brief Cats-reunion Piet Veerman had a solo-hit in 1987 with "Sailing Home". Subsequent singles did reasonably well and he kept touring with a set of solo material and Cats' classics, often using backing tapes. In 1995, Piet guested on a bilingual duet version of "One Way Wind" with Flemish singer Dana Winner titled "Westenwind". Piet sang in English and Winner sang in Dutch.

2000s
On 23 March 2006, The Cats were made Members of the Order of Orange-Nassau. The same year the group had a reunion to record a single for inclusion on a best of album. It went gold.

Cees Veerman performed with the Cats Aglow Band who both supported and backed Willy DeVille at the latter's Amsterdam Carré Theatre show on 7 July 2008. He moved to Indonesia where he died at the age of 70 on 15 March 2014.

Discography

Albums

Singles

References

External links

 The Cats (Dutch)

Dutch rock music groups
Volendam
Musical groups established in 1964